Cornelius Neal Petties (born September 16, 1940) is a former American football end. He played for the Baltimore Colts from 1964 to 1966.

References

1940 births
Living people
Players of American football from San Diego
American football ends
San Diego State Aztecs football players
Baltimore Colts players